The Strait of Sicily Tunnel is a proposed megaproject to link Sicily and Tunisia. A preliminary study was promoted by the ENEA institute.

The connections across the Strait of Sicily, as of 2011, are by car ferry and air travel. There are ferries Palermo–Tunis (3 round trips per week), Trapani–Tunis (1 round trip per week), Civitavecchia–Tunis (2 per week), Genoa–Tunis, and Marseille–Tunis.

See also
 Strait of Messina Bridge
 Strait of Gibraltar crossing
 Mediterranean Sea
 Channel Tunnel
 Intercontinental and transoceanic fixed links

References

External links
 Il progetto del canale Sicilia-Tunisia
 Allo studio un tunnel sottomarino per unire Sicilia e Tunisia
 Czech to Adriaport artificial island Tunnel*

Proposed undersea tunnels in Europe
Transport in Sicily
Megaprojects
Proposed undersea tunnels in Africa
Transport in Tunisia